The 1931 Kilkenny Senior Hurling Championship was the 37th staging of the Kilkenny Senior Hurling Championship since its establishment by the Kilkenny County Board.

On 13 December 1931, Carrickshock won the championship after a 5-08 to 3-08 defeat of Urlingford in the final. It was their first ever championship title.

Results

Final

References

Kilkenny Senior Hurling Championship
Kilkenny Senior Hurling Championship